Boris Borisovich Rohdendorf (12 July 190421 November 1977) was a Soviet 
entomologist and curator at the Zoological Museum at the University of Moscow. He attained the position of head of the Laboratory of Arthropods, Paleontological Institute of Russian Academy of Sciences, Academy of Sciences of the USSR (now Russian Academy of Sciences) in Moscow. A student of Andrey Martynov, he was a prolific taxonomist who described numerous new taxa, including fossil Diptera, and published important syntheses on fossil insects. His work is being extensively revised by the current generation of Russian paleoentomologists.

Partial bibliography
 Rohdendorf, B.B. 1937. [Dipteran insects, Vol. 19, No. 1: Fam. Sarcophagidae (Part 1), Fauna of the USSR, New Series,] No. 12 Moscow & Leningrad, 501pp. (In Russian and German) 
 Rohdendorf, B.B. 1962. Order Diptera. In B.B. Rohdendorf (editor), Fundamentals of Paleontology, vol. 9, Arthropoda-Tracheata and Chelicerata: 444–502. [1991 English translation of Russian original, Smithsonian Institution Libraries and National Science Foundation]
 Rohdendorf, B.B. 1964. [Historical development of dipterous insects]. Trudy Paleontol. Inst. 100, 311 pp. 
Rohdendorf, B.B. 1974. The historical development of Diptera. University of Alberta Press, Edmonton. 360 pp. (English translation)
 Rohdendorf, B.B. 1967. [Directions in the historical development of sarcophagids (Diptera, Sarcophagidae)] Moscow, 92pp. (In Russian) 
 Rohdendorf, B.B. and Rasnitsyn, A.P. (Editors) 1980. [A historical development of the class of insects]  Moscow, 269pp. (In Russian).

References
 
 , pp. 12–16.

External links
Biography 
Fossil Diptera Catalog - Major Workers and Collections

1904 births
1977 deaths
Soviet paleontologists
Soviet entomologists